William Oscar Armstrong was a state legislator in Massachusetts. He served in the Massachusetts House of Representatives. He was elected from Ward 9 in 1886.
He lived at 92 Harrishof Street.

See also
List of African-American officeholders (1900-1959)

References

African-American state legislators in Massachusetts
19th-century American politicians
Year of birth missing
Year of death missing